Lieutenant-General Thomas Edgar Lacy (7 February 1804 – 22 February 1880) was a British Army officer who became Commandant, Staff College, Sandhurst.

Military career
Lacy was commissioned into the 72nd Highlanders in 1826. He was promoted to lieutenant on 3 October 1826, to captain on 11 July 1834 and to major on 10 November 1846. He became Town Major of Gibraltar on 13 August 1847. He was promoted to lieutenant-colonel on 22 June 1854.

He became Commandant, Staff College, Sandhurst on 1 January 1865. He was promoted to lieutenant-general on his retirement in October 1877.

References

British Army lieutenant generals
1804 births
1880 deaths
72nd Highlanders officers
Commandants of the Staff College, Camberley